Pú (蒲) is a Chinese surname.

Notable people
 Fu Jian (317–355) (Chinese: 苻健; 317–355), originally named Pu Jian (蒲健, name changed 350), courtesy name Jianye (建業), the founding emperor of the Chinese/Di state Former Qin
 Pu Shougeng
 Pu Songling (蒲松齡), a Qing dynasty Chinese writer, best known as the author of Strange Stories from a Chinese Studio
 Pu Hua (蒲華, c. 1834–1911) a Qing dynasty landscape painter and calligrapher
 Pu Tze-chun (蒲澤春; dob unknown ) an admiral of the Republic of China Navy (ROCN) in Taiwan
 Mu-ming Poo, Chinese-American neuroscientist
 Ai-jen Poo (蒲艾眞; born 1974, ancestry: Taiwan) is an American labor activist, director of the National Domestic Workers Alliance
 Kevin Pu Jun Jin (蒲俊錦; born 1984) is a Chinese racing driver currently competing in the TCR Asia Series
 Pu Zhelong (蒲蛰龙; 1912–1997, born Yunnan, ancestry: Qinzhou, Guangxi) a Chinese entomologist and an academician of the Chinese Academy of
 Pu Tiansheng (or Pu Tian-shen, Chinese: 蒲添生, 1912~1996) a Taiwanese sculptor

Individual Chinese surnames